Robert Harley may refer to:

Politicians
Robert Harley (1579–1656), English statesman, Member of Parliament for Radnor and Herefordshire
Robert Harley (died 1673) (1626–1673), British Member of Parliament for Radnor
Robert Harley, 1st Earl of Oxford and Earl Mortimer (1661–1724), Member of Parliament for Radnor and Tregony
Robert Harley (c. 1706 – 1774), Member of Parliament for Leominster, 1731–1741 and 1742–1747, and Droitwich
Robert William Harley (1829–1892), British colonial administrator

Others
Robert Harley (mathematician) (1828–1910), English Congregational minister
Robert Harley (writer), British comedy writer
Bob Harley (1888–1958), Canadian footballer
Rob Harley (born 1990), Scottish rugby union player